Crenicichla vittata is a species of cichlid native to South America. It is found in the Paraná River basin, in the Paraguay River in Brazil and Paraguay, and in the Paraná River drainage in Argentina; also found in the middle Uruguay River drainage in Brazil.

References

vittata
Fish of Paraguay
Freshwater fish of Brazil
Freshwater fish of Argentina
Fish described in 1840
Taxa named by Johann Jakob Heckel